Zapadny (masculine), Zapadnaya (feminine), Zapadnoye (neuter), or Zapadnyy may refer to:
Zapadny Okrug (disambiguation), several okrugs and city okrugs in Russia
Zapadny District, until 1960, name of Gorodovikovsky District of the Republic of Kalmykia, Russia
Zapadny (rural locality) (Zapadnaya, Zapadnoye), several rural localities in Russia
Zapadnaya crater, an impact crater in Ukraine
 Zapadnyy (village), a small village located in Kostroma Oblast, Russia